Chanaka Withanage (born 26 June 1976) is a Sri Lankan former cricketer. He played in 117 first-class and 44 List A matches between 1996/97 and 2016/17. He made his Twenty20 debut on 17 August 2004, for Ragama Cricket Club in the 2004 SLC Twenty20 Tournament.

References

External links
 

1976 births
Living people
Sri Lankan cricketers
Badureliya Sports Club cricketers
Galle Cricket Club cricketers
Lankan Cricket Club cricketers
Ragama Cricket Club cricketers
Sri Lanka Army Sports Club cricketers
Tamil Union Cricket and Athletic Club cricketers
Place of birth missing (living people)